George Floyd Jr. (born December 21, 1960) is an American former professional football player who was a defensive back for two seasons with the New York Jets of the National Football League (NFL). Over his NFL career, Floyd appeared in ten games during the Jets' 1982 season, including three playoff games, and eight in their 1984 season, with two games started. Floyd retired after sustaining a knee injury in the 1985 NFL preseason.

Born in Tampa, Florida, he grew up in Brooksville, Florida, where he attended Hernando High School. While there, Floyd was selected for The Tampa Tribune all-area football team in all three of his varsity years, the first player to be so named. He played college football at Eastern Kentucky University (EKU), where he won the 1979 NCAA Division I-AA football championship. An All-American in 1980 and 1981, Floyd is the holder or joint holder of five records at EKU. Floyd has been inducted into the College Football Hall of Fame, and the hall of fame classes of EKU and Hernando High School; in 2009, EKU named Floyd to their All-Century team. , he works as a vice principal at Boone County High School in Kentucky.

Early life
George Floyd Jr. was born on December 21, 1960, in Tampa, Florida, and grew up in Brooksville, Florida. He attended Hernando High School, and played football and basketball for the Hernando Leopards. As a sophomore, Floyd was named starting free safety before the 1975 football season. He tied for the team lead with three interceptions and finished with eighty-four tackles, third-most on the Leopards, as Hernando finished as Gulf Coast (GC) Conference champions. After the season, Floyd was named to the GC All-Star team, composed of the best football players in the conference, and made The Tampa Tribune (TTT) all-area football team, composed of the best high school football players in the area.

During his junior year, Floyd was named the Leopards' punt returner, and also played on offense as a halfback, where he was used primarily in blocking situations. He had a two-interception game against Inverness Citrus in a 20–12 Leopards victory on September 17. In a game against the Lake Weir High School Hurricanes, Floyd had a seventy-two yard punt return for a touchdown. Hernando finished with a 5–5 win–loss record. After the season, Floyd made the GC all-conference roster and TTT all-area team. In basketball, the Leopards, for whom Floyd also played, finished with a 17–9 record.

As a senior in 1977, in a game against North Marion High School, he had an interception and twelve tackles; he earned TTT Hernando County Player of the Week for the performance on September 30. Floyd had a four-interception game against Pasco High School during the season, and finished the year with nine total interceptions, the latter of which established a record which stood for four years. The Leopards finished with a 7–3 record as Floyd was named to TTT all-area team: with the accomplishment, Floyd became the first player of any high school named to TTT team during all three varsity seasons. The Florida Sports Writers Association named Floyd to their second-team Class 3A all-state squad in January 1978. He wanted to play college football for the University of Georgia as a senior, but instead attended Eastern Kentucky University (EKU) of the Ohio Valley Conference (OVC). He served as captain of the Leopards' defensive unit each year he played for Hernando. In 2011, Floyd was inducted into Hernando High School's Hall of Fame.

Collegiate career

Floyd's first start with the EKU Colonels came as a freshman against the Murray State Racers at roverback, where he led the defense with twelve tackles and was named an honorable mention for OVC Defensive Player of the Week (DPOW). He finished the season with twenty-six tackles, eighth most on the team, with four tackles for loss (TFLs) and one fumble recovery as the Colonels finished with an 8–2 record. The team's eight wins tied a school record for most wins in a season. In Floyd's sophomore year, he had a three-interception game against Austin Peay in a 35–10 EKU victory in September, and, against Jackson State in November, had sixteen tackles, one interception and one fumble recovery. The Colonels finished with an 11–2 record and defeated the Lehigh Engineers 30–7 to win the 1979 NCAA Division I-AA football championship, the first in EKU's history. He was named Second-team All-OVC, and led the conference with thirteen punt returns and seven interceptions. He started every game, his sixty-eight tackles were fourth-most on the Colonels, and he led the team with four fumble recoveries.

Before the 1980 season, OVC football head coaches voted Floyd to the preseason All-OVC Team. In a game against Youngstown State Floyd returned an interception one hundred yards, tying a conference record, and scored a touchdown. Floyd shared OVC DPOW honors for a game against the Western Kentucky Hilltoppers in which he had thirteen tackles. He won OVC Defensive Player of the Year, made the OVC All-Conference first-team, and was named a Kodak and an Associated Press All-American as the Colonels finished with a 10–3 record and lost to the Boise State Broncos in the championship game 31–29. He finished the regular season tied for most interceptions in the OVC, with five, and finished with sixty-three tackles, seven TFLs and one fumble recovery. On special teams, Floyd returned 17 punts for 142 yards.

Before the 1981 season, an EKU media guide described Floyd as "one of the most consistent players EKU has ever had in the secondary" and as a "very intense player". He was co-captain of the team his senior year. Floyd won OVC DPOW for his performance in an October 24 game against Western Kentucky in which he had a sack, a pass deflected, an interception, and eight tackles. In a game against Murray State, Floyd intercepted a pass from quarterback Gino Gibbs on the EKU two-yard line with sixteen seconds left in the game as EKU won 24–20. Floyd won co-DPOW honors for his performance. After the regular season, Floyd won OVC Defensive Player of the Year, was voted to the First-team All-OVC, was selected as a Kodak and an Associated Press All-American, and won OVC Athlete of the Year. In the postseason, Floyd had a two-interception game against the Broncos in a 23–17 EKU victory, though the Colonels lost in the championship game to the Idaho State Bengals 34–23 and finished with a 12–2 record. He finished the year with seventy-two tackles and ten interceptions, and, on special teams, returned thirty-six punts for 314 yards and a touchdown.

At the end of his tenure with EKU, Floyd was in the school's record book no fewer than eight times, and, he holds or ties five school records: for longest interception return (100 yards), most punt returns in a single season (36), most interceptions in a single season (10), most career interceptions (22), and most career interception return yards (328). In 1999, Floyd was inducted into the College Football Hall of Fame, and, in 2007, EKU inducted him into their Hall of Fame. Floyd was elected to EKU's All-Century team in 2009.

Professional career
The New York Jets selected Floyd in the fourth round of the 1982 NFL Draft, with the 107th overall selection. Floyd signed a contract with the Jets in June 1982. John Rowe of The Record described Floyd as a "hard hitter" in July. In Jets training camp, Floyd was the third-string free safety, behind starter Darrol Ray and Jesse Johnson, and competed for a spot as a kick returner with Kurt Sohn, Lonell Phea, and Kolas Elion. Floyd appeared at both safety spots (both free safety and strong safety). Bill Verigan of the New York Daily News projected "only a very few, perhaps three or four" of the Jets' new players to make the team. Floyd made the team after final cuts. During the 1982 NFL strike, Floyd worked out at EKU; when he returned to New York, he worked in construction, installing windows in skyscrapers. Floyd appeared in ten games for the 1982 New York Jets, including three playoff games, as the Jets finished the shortened regular season with a 6–3 record and lost in the AFC Championship Game to the Miami Dolphins 14–0. According to Pete Reinwald of TTT, Floyd saw "limited action" over the season on special teams and as a backup safety.

Prior to the 1983 season, Floyd tried out for punt returner along with Kirk Springs and Davlin Mullen. On August 12, Filip Bondy of the New York Daily News stated Floyd had the defensive backfield reserve spot "wrapped up". During the preseason, Floyd moved from safety to cornerback, and averaged 15.2 yards per return as a punt returner and 30.2 yards per return as a kickoff returner, with one interception. In a preseason game against the New Orleans Saints, Floyd suffered a sprained knee on a kickoff return he fumbled. The Jets placed Floyd on their injured reserve list (IRL), and Floyd missed the entire 1983 season.

Floyd was placed on the IRL again before the 1984 season with a hyperextended knee that bothered him intermittently throughout the preseason. He was activated from the IRL in late October, and became a starter in early November for injured right cornerback Russell Carter. Paul Needell of the New York Daily News described Floyd as the fifth-best corner on the Jets by the time he was a starter, and Rowe described Floyd and Mullen as the Achilles' heel of the Jets defense on November 19. Over the course of the 1984 season, Floyd started two games for the Jets and appeared in eight as the team finished with a 7–9 record and missed the playoffs. In the 1985 preseason, Floyd re-injured his knee and was placed on the IRL. The Jets waived Floyd in October 1985, after which Floyd retired.

Personal life
As a junior in high school, Floyd wanted to join the United States Army. Floyd has two sisters, Lynn Floyd and Dianna Butts, and a brother, Willie Floyd. As a senior in college, Floyd wanted to play professionally for a team in Texas. He was a physical education major at EKU, and wanted to teach after graduation before being drafted by the Jets. Between being drafted and reporting to training camp for New York, Floyd worked as a student teacher at Tates Creek Junior High School in Lexington, Kentucky. He married Cheryl Johnson in March 1983. After his NFL career, Floyd worked as an assistant coach at Bellevue High School in Kentucky. He taught physical education for eighteen years at Bellevue and Boone County High Schools and, works as an assistant principal at Boone County High School.

In June 2020, a photograph of Floyd was erroneously included in a montage at the funeral of George Perry Floyd Jr., a man murdered during an arrest in Minneapolis, Minnesota. The montage was broadcast on various news networks.

Notes

References

1960 births
Living people
People from Florence, Kentucky
American football safeties
Eastern Kentucky Colonels football players
New York Jets players
College Football Hall of Fame inductees
Players of American football from Tampa, Florida
Schoolteachers from Florida